Raesibe Martha Moatshe (born 2 September 1973) is a South African politician who was elected to the National Assembly of South Africa in the 2019 general election. Moatshe is a member of the African National Congress.

In parliament, she serves on the Portfolio Committee on Trade and Industry.

References

External links

Profile at Parliament of South Africa

Living people
1973 births
People from Limpopo
African National Congress politicians
Members of the National Assembly of South Africa
Women members of the National Assembly of South Africa
21st-century South African politicians